Barron Falls (Aboriginal: Din Din) is a steep tiered cascade waterfall on the Barron River located where the river descends from the Atherton Tablelands to the Cairns coastal plain, in Queensland, Australia.

In 2009 as part of the Q150 celebrations, the Barron Falls was announced as one of the Q150 Icons of Queensland for its role as a "Natural attraction".

Location and features

Protected within the Barron Gorge National Park, the volume of water seen in the upper photo only occurs after substantial rainfall during the wet season. For much of the rest of the year, little more than a trickle is evident, due in part to the presence of a weir behind the head of the falls that supplies the Barron Gorge Hydroelectric Power Station located downstream in the gorge.

The Barron Falls may be viewed and reached by road via the Kennedy Highway that crosses the Barron River upstream of the falls, near . The narrow-gauge Kuranda Scenic Railway and the Skyrail aerial tram also leads from the coastal plain to the tablelands. The train stops at Barron Falls overlook, where passengers may disembark for several minutes.  The Skyrail stops at two rainforest mid-stations, Red Peak and Barron Falls.  The trail at Barron Falls Skyrail station leads through the rainforest to three separate lookouts providing views of the Gorge and Falls.

Etymology
 
The falls were named for Thomas Henry Bowman Barron, the Chief Clerk of Police in Brisbane in the 1860s.

Tourist attraction
The falls were one of the most popular tourist attractions in Queensland by the 1890s.  Visitors are drawn to the natural features and scenery.

See also 

 List of waterfalls of Queensland

References

External links

 

Waterfalls of Far North Queensland
Cascade waterfalls
Articles containing video clips